Young adult fiction awards recognize outstanding works of young adult fiction.

Young adult awards

The Canadian Library Association gave a young adult book award for Canadian books from 1981 until the group's disbandment in 2016.

Children's/young adult awards

These awards are granted to either a children's or a young adult book.

See also
 :Category:Young adult literature awards

References

Young adult fiction
Young adult literature
young adult